Institute of Geochemistry, which is located in Guiyang, the capital of Guizhou Province of China, was founded in 1966 by the Beijing Institute of Geology, Chinese Academy of Sciences (now Institute of Geology and Geophysics, Chinese Academy of Sciences).

See also
Geochemistry

External links
Official website (English)
Official website (Chinese)
Kunming Branch of CAS
Chinese Academy of Sciences

Research institutes of the Chinese Academy of Sciences
Education in Guizhou
Guiyang
Geochemistry